Twin, also known as Yampertown, is a town in Marion County, Alabama, United States. It is about equidistant from Brilliant, Guin and Winfield. It incorporated on August 6, 2002, becoming the 10th incorporated community in Marion County. It had a population of 359 as of the 2020 census.

Geography
Twin is in southern Marion County, bordered to the west and east by the city of Guin. I-22/US 78 passes through the town, with access from exit 26 (SR 44). SR 44 leads east  to Brilliant and southwest  to Guin, while SR 253 leads southeast  to Winfield and north  to Haacleburg.

Yampertown, the town center, is in the valley of Luxapallila Creek where it is joined by Cooper Creek. The Luxapallila is a southwest-flowing tributary of the Tombigbee River.

Demographics

References

Towns in Marion County, Alabama
Towns in Alabama